Acrobasis zacharias is a species of snout moth in the genus Acrobasis. It was described by Roesler in 1988. It is found in Afghanistan.

References

Moths described in 1988
Acrobasis
Moths of Asia